

Key 
Key to record:
Pld = Matches played
W = Matches won
D = Matches drawn
L = Matches lost
GF = Goals for
GA = Goals against
GD = Goals diffence
Win % = Win ratio

Shenyang Ginde & Changsha Ginde 

 Serhiy Morozov (1994)
 Zhang Zengqun (1995)
 Li Yingfa (1996)
 Li Qiang (1996–98)
 Ademar Braga (1999)
 Li Qiang (1999)
 Valery Nepomnyashchy (2000 – Oct 8, 2000)
 Henryk Kasperczak (2000–01)
 Alain Laurier (2001)
 Toni (July 1, 2002 – Dec 31, 2002)
 Dragoslav Stepanović (June 26, 2003 – Dec 31, 2003)
 Bob Houghton (Nov 25, 2005 – June 9, 2006)
 Martin Koopman (2006)
 Milan Živadinović (2007)
 Slobodan Santrač (Dec 24, 2007 – June 26, 2008)
 Zhu Bo(Caretaker) (June 26, 2008 – July 21, 2008)
 Zhu Bo (July 21, 2008 – Oct 12, 2009)
 Hao Wei (Oct 12, 2009 – June 21, 2010)
 Miodrag Ješić (June 21, 2010 – 2010)

Managers 

Guangzhou City F.C.
Guangzhou RandF